Tebenna gnaphaliella, the everlasting tebenna moth, is a moth of the family Choreutidae. It is found from Florida to California and north at least to New Hampshire.

The wingspan is about 10 mm. The forewings are brown basally and in the terminal area. The median and subterminal areas have dense light gray speckling and three irregular white spots arranged in a triangle, each white spot is surrounded by black shading. The legs and antennae are banded black and white. It is extremely similar/identical to the Palearctic Tebenna micalis.

Adults are on wing in June and July. There are probably at least two generations per year. They are usually found on flowers of herbaceous plants.

The larvae feed on various plants (cudweed, everlasting, pussytoes) formerly placed in the genus Gnaphalium, including Pseudognaphalium obtusifolium, Pseudognaphalium helleri, and Helichrysum species. They mine the leaves of their host plant and can cause considerable damage to cultivated and ornamental plants. They have a dark shiny green body, tapered at both ends and lighter colored at each abdominal joint.

References

External links
mothphotographersgroup
microleps.org

Tebenna
Moths described in 1902